An election for all 24 members of Sligo Corporation took place on 15 January 1919, using the single transferable vote (STV).  Urban districts in Ireland held annual elections on 15 January each year under the Local Government (Ireland) Act 1898, using plurality voting to replace a cohort of one-third or one-quarter of their councillors. Those elections for 1915–19 were postponed while the First World War was still in progress.

The Sligo election was held under the Sligo Corporation Act of 1918, a private act passed in the UK Parliament under the sponsorship of the Sligo Ratepayers Association (SRA), an alliance of Protestants and businessmen which opposed the actions of the outgoing corporation. The election under the 1918 act was exempt from the general postponement.

In the 1919 election, the SRA ran a slate of 18 candidates (11 Protestant and 7 Catholic) and won 8 seats; Sinn Féin, Labour, and an Independent Nationalist had a majority of 13 seats between them. It was the second STV election ever in Ireland; the first was in Dublin University at the November 1918 Westminster election. The outcome was seen as a vindication of STV, which was adopted for all Irish local authorities by the Local Government (Ireland) Act 1919, in time for the 1920 local elections. The 1918 act envisaged triennial elections in Sligo, as the 1919 act did throughout Ireland. In the event, the Irish War of Independence, Irish Civil War, and aftermath meant the next local elections were postponed  until 1925.

Results by party

Results by Ward

East Ward

North Ward

West Ward

Sources

References

1919 Irish local elections
Corporation Election, 1919